Exeter College may refer to:

 Exeter College, Oxford, a college of Oxford University
 Exeter College, Devon, a further education college in Exeter, Devon
 Exeter College of Art and Design, a former college in Exeter, Devon